Charles Brooks Hoard (June 5, 1805 – November 20, 1886) was a U.S. Representative from New York.

Biography
Born in Springfield, Vermont, Hoard attended the public schools.  He moved to Antwerp, New York, where he trained as a clerk, watch repairer, and mechanic.  He was Antwerp's postmaster in the 1830s.

Hoard subsequently established a partnership with Gilbert Bradford, and the firm of Hoard & Bradford became successful as the manufacturer of portable steam engines to operate printing presses and other machines.

Hoard was a member of the New York State Assembly (Jefferson Co.) in 1838.

He moved to Watertown, New York, in January 1844.  He served as Clerk of Jefferson County from 1844 to 1846.

Originally a Democrat identified with the Free Soil and Barnburner movements, Hoard's anti-slavery views led him to become a Republican when that party was founded.

Hoard was elected as a Republican to the Thirty-fifth and Thirty-sixth Congresses (March 4, 1857 – March 3, 1861).

During the Civil War he engaged in the manufacture of rifles for the Union.  Disputes with the War Department over fulfillment of the contract caused Hoard a financial loss.

Eli Thayer, the founder of Ceredo, West Virginia, had originally established the community as a model town in an effort to show southerners that a community could function without slavery.  Thayer had borrowed from Hoard to finance the creation of the town.

In the late 1860s Hoard spent time traveling in the western and southern states to inspect his business concerns.  In 1870 he relocated to Ceredo.  His efforts to improve the town and repair his fortunes proved successful, with Hoard leading expansion of Ceredo's timber industry, including the building of a sawmill and the construction of roads and railroads.

He died in Ceredo on November 20, 1886. He was interred in Spring Hill Cemetery, Huntington, West Virginia.

Sources

John A. Haddock, The Growth of a Century: as Illustrated in the History of Jefferson County, New York, 1894, pages 43–47

1805 births
1886 deaths
People from Springfield, Vermont
People from Antwerp, New York
Politicians from Watertown, New York
People from Ceredo, West Virginia
Members of the New York State Assembly
New York (state) Democrats
New York (state) Free Soilers
People of New York (state) in the American Civil War
Republican Party members of the United States House of Representatives from New York (state)
19th-century American politicians
Burials at Spring Hill Cemetery (Huntington, West Virginia)